Fereydoon Family (born September 18, 1945) is a leading Persian physicist in the field of nanotechnology and solid-state physics. He is currently Samuel Candler Dobbs Professor of Physics and a member of the Emerson Center for Scientific Computation at Emory University in Atlanta, Georgia. He is an elected fellow of the American Physical Society,  and a recipient of the Southeastern Section of the American Physical Society's highest honor, the J.W. Beams Award.

Biography
Family received his B.S. degree in Physics from Worcester Polytechnic Institute in 1968 and his Ph.D in physics at Clark University in 1974. He has been a visiting scientist at the Institute for Theoretical Physics at the University of California at Santa Barbara and a Visiting Associate Professor of Chemistry at Massachusetts Institute of Technology.

Publications

Journal articles
He has published 161 scientific papers, almost all of them in high-ranking peer-reviewed journals. The most heavily cited was cited as many as 547 times. The ten most frequently cited are:

 Family F, Vicsek T, Scaling of the Active Zone in the Eden Process on Percolation Networks and the Ballistic Deposition Model Journal of Physics A-Mathematical and General 18 (2): L75-L81 1985' (times cited: 547) 
Vicsek T, Family F, Dynamic Scaling for Aggregation of Clusters Physical Review Letters 52 (19): 1669-1672 1984 (times cited: 289) 
Family F, Dynamic Scaling and Phase-Transitions in Interface Growth Physica A 168 (1): 561-580 Sep 1 1990 (times cited: 259)
Family F, Scaling of Rough Surfaces - Effects of Surface-Diffusion Journal of Physics A-Mathematical and General 19 (8): L441-L446 Jun 1 1986 (times cited: 252) 
Amar g, Family F, Critical Cluster-Size - Island Morphology and Size Distribution in Submonolayer Epitaxial-Growth Physical Review Letters 74 (11): 2066-2069 Mar 13 1995 (times cited: 213)
Meakin P, Vicsek T, Family F, Dynamic Cluster-Size Distribution in Cluster-Cluster Aggregation - Effects of Cluster Diffusivity Physical Review B 31 (1): 564-569 1985 (times cited: 206) 
Amar J, Family F, Lam P, Dynamic Scaling of the Island-Size Distribution and Percolation in a Model of Submonolayer Molecular-Beam Epitaxy Physical Review B 50 (12): 8781-8797 Sep 15 1994 (times cited: 175)
Amar J, Family F, Numerical-Solution of A Continuum Equation for Interface Growth in 2+1 Dimensions Physical Review A  41 (6): 3399-3402 Mar 15 1990 (times cited: 137) 
Family F, Meakin P, Scaling of the Droplet-Size Distribution in Vapor-Deposited Thin-Films Physical Review Letters 61 (4): 428-431 Jul 25 1988 (times Ccitedited: 133) 
Family F, Meakin P, Deutch J, Kinetics of Coagulation with Fragmentation - Scaling Behavior and Fluctuations Physical Review Letters 57 (6): 727-730 Aug 11 1986 (times cited: 127) 
Gould H, Family F, Stanley H, Kinetics of Formation of Randomly Branched Aggregates - A Renormalization-Group Approach Physical Review Letters 50 (9): 686-689 1983 (times cited: 122)

Books on physics
Kinetics of Aggregation and Gelation (North-Holland, Amsterdam), 1984. (cited 115 times according to Google Scholar)
Dynamics of Fractal Surfaces (World Scientific, Singapore), 1991. (cited 284 times according to Google Scholar)
Fractal Aspects of Materials (Materials Research Society, Pittsburgh), 1995.
Scaling and Disordered Systems (World-Scientific, Singapore), 2002.
Challenges In Computational Statistical Physics In The 21st Century, Proceedings of STATPHYS satellite conference (Special Issue of Computer Physics Communications), 2002.
Dynamics and Friction in the Submicrometer Confining Systems (American Chemical Society, Washington, DC), 2004.

References

Physics Computing News, 1994. "Information about the Candidates".

External links
 Family's homepage
 Nanobiology International Conference website
 Fereydoon Family | The Future of Nanotechnology

21st-century American physicists
Iranian emigrants to the United States
Iranian expatriate academics
Iranian physicists
Iranian nanotechnologists
Clark University alumni
Emory University faculty
1945 births
Living people
Fellows of the American Physical Society